Sugarloaf ( is a landmark in the Port Hills to the south of the city of Christchurch in New Zealand. The Māori part of the name means the headcomb of Kahukura. The Sugarloaf communications tower is an iconic radio and television transmission mast located on top of the hill.

Geography
The tower is situated at an elevation of 493.78 m on the top of the Port Hills, near Dyers Pass. This area is officially known as Sugarloaf Scenic Reserve. This reserve land occasionally doubles as a sheep farm and includes a car park lookout point for general public use.

Communications tower
In 1962, the New Zealand Broadcasting Corporation leased a 4.9ha section of the reserve from the Crown on the summit of Sugarloaf Hill to install and operate a television communications tower and control building. The tower and building were completed in 1965. Television channel CHTV3 started transmitting from the tower at 9:00 AM on 28 August 1965.

With a height of 121 m, the lattice steel structured tower is founded on a 5-metre deep concrete pad underlain by basalt volcanic rock. It is situated approximately 50 m behind the main transmission building, which combined with the tower is visible from most parts of Christchurch city.

Visual appearance
At a closer glance, the red and white tower includes an array of antennas including parabolic dishes, dipoles and microwave links. The tower has three main service decks for authorised technicians only with access ladders that run vertically along the eastern side. At night the tower is illuminated with three red beacons which span across the mast almost at the bottom and middle with the top light flashing on & off every second or so. On a clear night and viewed from the city you can often see the beacons and some fluorescent lighting coming from a room inside the transmission house.

Transmission house
The tower is located 50 m behind a single storey transmission building which houses multiple transmission gear. The main equipment room is fully air conditioned and known to local technicians as the great transmitter hall. The building is approximately 40 m in width and 20 m in depth. On the roof of this building there are several satellites, small antennae and multiple parabolic dishes for private WiFi networks. There are two main shielded cable runs that go between the transmission house and back to the tower. This building has been unmanned for several years.

Site access
The entire transmission site is surrounded by a mesh security fence and a continuous hedge mixed with foliage. Access to the tower is highly restricted to authorised personnel only and climbing the tower is strictly prohibited. Vehicle access to the actual site itself is restricted via a locked gate, however there is a car park lookout point located 200m in front of the tower with panoramic views of Canterbury. Access to this reserve is permitted to the general public until approximately 6:00PM. After this time the gate between Summit Road and Service Lane is locked until the following morning.

Technical aspects
The main antennas transmit TV and VHF FM signals in the 88 MHz to 610 MHz range. The composite total power fed to all of the transmitting antennas is approximately 64 kW while the antenna gain values range from 7.8 to 16.5 dBd. Multiple services operate off the tower including television, radio, emergency response, aviation, cellular and other data signals.

The tower covers much of Christchurch and central Canterbury, for example the DVB-T signal reaches as far as Waipara in the north, the foothills of the Southern Alps in the west, and the Rangitata River in the south. However, not all of the central Canterbury region is covered by this tower. The nearby township of Akaroa (and most of the settlements near Akaroa) have limited to non-existent TV reception and variable radio reception. This long-term problem could be solved by the construction of a second tower at least 10 km away from Sugarloaf Mountain, but it is unclear if this option has ever been given technical consideration. Likewise, the Christchurch suburbs of Redcliffs and Sumner have limited coverage from Sugarloaf, with radio (and formerly analogue television) provided through a low-power repeater in the suburb of Southshore.

Transmission frequencies
This table contains television frequencies currently operating at Sugarloaf, and the FM broadcast frequencies are contained in this linked list of stations article:

Former analogue television frequencies
The following frequencies were used until 28 April 2013, when Sugarloaf switched off analogue broadcasts.

Case Studies
An RF emissions report conducted on 9 February 1998 by the National Radiation Laboratory found that maximum exposure levels of 8 μW/cm2 were detected in the car park area, immediately below the Sugar Loaf antenna. This is 4% of the maximum of 200 μW/cm2 specified for public exposure levels in NZS 6609.1:1990. As the distance from the antenna increased, the exposure levels decreased markedly and, in general, were below 2 μW/cm2. The report concluded that the site is operating in accordance with NZS 6609.1:1990.

Gallery

Management
The tower and building are currently owned and maintained by Kordia, previously known as Broadcast Communications Limited (BCL NZ).

References

External links

 Sugarloaf Communications Tower as seen in Google Maps
 Panorama View from Sugarloaf Scenic Reserve
 Christchurch City Council Reserve Information
 Port Hills Visitor Information
 Digital Switch Over Information for New Zealand 404
 1998 RF Emissions Report for The Sugarloaf Communications Tower
 2005 Tower Upgrade Contract
 Sugarloaf Scenic Reserve Dog Control Map
 Sugarloaf Freeview coverage
 Cashmere Spur and Bowenvale Valley Reserves

Buildings and structures in Christchurch
Mountains of Canterbury, New Zealand